The Mohawk & Hudson Railroad was the first railroad built in the state of New York and one of the first railroads in the United States. It was so-named because it linked the Mohawk River at Schenectady with the Hudson River at Albany. It was conceived as a means of allowing Erie Canal passengers to quickly bypass the circuitous Cohoes Falls via steam powered trains.

The railroad was incorporated on April 17, 1826,<ref
 name=PRRchron>Christopher T. Baer, [http://www.prrths.com/newprr_files/Hagley/PRR_hagley_intro.htm Pennsylvania RR Chronology], Sunday, January 20, 2013, A GENERAL CHRONOLOGY OF THE PENNSYLVANIA RAILROAD COMPANY PREDECESSORS AND SUCCESSORS AND ITS HISTORICAL CONTEXT © 2004-2011 Pennsylvania Technical and Historical Society p.5</ref> as the Mohawk & Hudson Company and opened for public service on August 9, 1831.  On April 19, 1847, the company name was changed to the Albany & Schenectady Railroad. The railroad was consolidated into the New York Central Railroad on May 17, 1853.

History
On December 28, 1825, Schenectady County resident (Duanesburg) George William Featherstonhaugh  (pronounced Fenshaw) ran a newspaper notice announcing the formation of the Mohawk & Hudson Rail Road Company.  The intention was to bypass the Erie Canal between Albany and Schenectady, cutting time for the trip from a whole day to under one hour. The Mohawk & Hudson became the first chartered railroad in New York State on April 17, 1826.

Construction began in August 1830 and the railroad opened September 24, 1831, on a 16-mile route between Albany and Schenectady through the Pine Bush region that separates both cities. The civil engineer Peter Fleming surveyed the right-of-way and provided the cost estimates.  Fleming resigned in 1830 and was replaced by John B. Jervis.  The tracks were made of strap rail resting on stone blocks rather than crossties that later became standard.  Initially the line ended outside the two cities to avoid steep grades — in Albany the line ended near the current intersection of Madison and Western Avenues — and the passengers covered the remaining distance in stagecoaches.  Later at each end an inclined plane with a fixed steam engine was used to raise and lower the train.

The DeWitt Clinton locomotive, built by the West Point Foundry in New York, made its first test run on July 2, 1831. After some hesitation it was decided that the engine would burn wood rather than coal. The official opening took place on September 24, 1831, with approximately eighty politicians and dignitaries.  The DeWitt Clinton, pulling three cars, covered the route in forty-seven minutes.  Another eight cars had to be pulled by horses.

In 1832, a rider wrote in his journal.

References

External links
Mohawk & Hudson Railroad details and map

Defunct New York (state) railroads
Predecessors of the New York Central Railroad
Erie Canal
Schenectady, New York
Railway companies established in 1847
Railway companies disestablished in 1853
Transportation in Albany, New York
History of Albany, New York
1826 establishments in New York (state)
Transportation in Albany County, New York
American companies disestablished in 1853
American companies established in 1847